This article lists the major power stations located in Shandong Province.

Non-renewable

Coal based

Gas-based

Nuclear-based

Renewable

Hydroelectric

Pumped-storage

Wind
Wind power has become the fastest growing new energy resource in Shandong province.  By February 2010, there were 24 operational wind farms with an electricity power capacity of 1,010MW. Shandong plans to build several off-shore wind farms that are over 1,000MW.

Biomass

References 

 
Shandong